Lycée Français du Caire (LFC) is the French International School in Cairo.

Organization

Structure 
There are three primary campuses, with one each in Maadi, New Cairo City, and Zamalek. The secondary classes are held in a campus in El Merag.

References

External links 

 Lycée Français du Caire website 
 Le site des anciens du Lycée Français du Caire website
 The unofficial student newspaper
 The Facebook page supporting the suspended teacher

International schools in Cairo
International schools in Greater Cairo
Cairo
Private schools in Cairo